Hapithus brevipennis, the short-winged bush cricket, is a species of bush cricket in the family Gryllidae. It is found in North America.

References

Hapithinae
Articles created by Qbugbot
Insects described in 1897